"Self Care" is a song recorded by American rapper Mac Miller for his fifth studio album Swimming (2018). It was written by Miller, Destin Route, Erica Wright, Jahmal Cantero, Devonte Hynes, and its producers Dacoury Natche, Eric Dan, Tyler Mason, and Peter Mudge. The track was released on July 13, 2018, as the second single from the album. Musically, "Self Care" is a two-part song, described as a "self-guided tour through [Miller's] personal rehabilitation" by Pitchforks Sheldon Pearce.

"Self Care" peaked at number 33 on the US Billboard Hot 100 after Miller's death in September 2018, becoming his highest-charting song as lead artist at the time. The song was certified triple platinum in the United States. Its music video, which references the film Kill Bill: Volume 2, shows Miller escaping a coffin after being buried alive.

Background and composition 
"Self Care" was released by Warner Bros. Records on July 13, 2018, as the second single from Mac Miller's fifth studio album Swimming. It is a two-part song, split between "Self Care" and "Oblivion". The first part was written by Miller, Destin Route, Devonte Hynes, and its producers Dacourny "DJ Dahi" Natche and Peter "Nice Rec" Mudge; it also contains an excerpt from  "On & On" by Erykah Badu, which was written by Badu and Jahmal Cantero. The second part was written by Miller and its producers Eric Dan, Tyler "Nostxlgic" Mason, and Mudge. Each part was recorded separately in 2017, at Conway Recording Studios in Los Angeles and ID Labs in Pittsburgh, respectively.

"Self Care" contains elements of R&B, space-funk and cloud rap. The song begins with "watercolor synth washes", as Miller croons its affirming chorus. Around halfway through, it abruptly switches to an "airy synth and glitchy" beat, turning its vibe "from claustrophobic to weightless." Billboards Gil Kaufman said the song "chronicles an emotional spiral, with Mac spinning out into 'oblivion,' which sounds like exactly the place he wants to be." Sheldon Pearce of Pitchfork described it as a "breezy, self-guided tour through [Miller's] personal rehabilitation."

Commercial performance 
In the United States, "Self Care" debuted at number 24 on the Billboard Bubbling Under Hot 100, and peaked at number 5 on the chart dated August 18, 2018. After Miller's death in September 2018, "Self Care" was propelled to number 33 on the US Billboard Hot 100, surpassing "Loud" (2012; number 53) as his highest-charting song as lead artist at the time. It also reached his highest peak as lead artist in Australia at number 83 on the ARIA Charts, in Canada at number 38 on the Canadian Hot 100, and in the United Kingdom at number 61 on the UK Singles Chart. His peaks set by "Self Care" were later surpassed by "Good News" in 2020. In September 2021, "Self Care" was certified triple platinum by the Recording Industry Association of America (RIAA) for combined sales and streaming data in excess of three million units in the United States.

Music video
A music video for "Self Care" was released on the same day as the song. Directed by Christian Weber, it begins with Miller buried alive inside a coffin. He raps his verses while smoking a cigarette, and carves "Memento mori" (Latin: "remember (that you have) to die") into the coffin using a pocket knife. After punching a hole into the coffin and emerging from the dirt, explosions send him flying. The video is an homage to a scene from the 2004 film Kill Bill: Volume 2.

Personnel 
Credits adapted from Swimmings liner notes and Tidal.

 Malcolm McCormick – lead vocals (as Mac Miller), songwriting
 Peter Mudge – additional production, additional programming (as Nice Rec)
 Ben Sedano – engineering assistant
 John Armstrong – engineering assistant
 Manny Marroquin – mix
 Chris Galland – engineering mix
 Robin Florent – engineering mix assistant
 Scott Desmarais – engineering mix assistant
 Mike Bozzi – mastering

"Self Care"
 Dacourny Natche – production, programming (as DJ Dahi)
 Devonte Hynes – songwriting, additional vocals
 Destin Route – songwriting, additional vocals (as Dicaprio)
 Erica Wright – songwriting
 Jahmal Cantero – songwriting
 Vic Wainstein – recording

"Oblivion"
 Eric Dan – production, programming, recording (as ID Labs)
 Tyler Mason – production, programming (as Nostxlgic)

Charts

Certifications

References

2018 singles
2018 songs
Mac Miller songs
Warner Records singles
Songs written by Erykah Badu
Songs written by DJ Dahi
Songs written by Dev Hynes
Songs written by JID
Songs written by Mac Miller